A monkey is a tailed simian.

Monkey(s) or The Monkey may also refer to:

Arts, entertainment, and media

Fictional characters
 Monkey (character), a puppet sock monkey who is best known for appearing in adverts for ITV Digital and PG Tips
 Monkey, a character in the animated TV series Dexter's Laboratory
 Monkey D. Luffy, a character in the anime series One Piece
 Monkey King, a character in the novel Journey to the West

Literature
 Monkey (novel), a translation by Arthur Waley of the Chinese story Journey to the West
 "The Monkey", a short story by Stephen King

Music
 Monkey (band), a California ska band
 "Monkey" (song), by George Michael
 "Monkey", a song by Counting Crows on the album Recovering the Satellites
 "Monkey", a song by Harry Belafonte on the album Jump Up Calypso
 "Monkey", a song by Bush on the album Sixteen Stone
 "Monkey", a song by Low on the album The Great Destroyer
 "Monkey", a song by M.I on the album The Chairman
 "Monkey", a song by Saves the Day on the album In Reverie
 "Monkeys", a song by Echo & the Bunnymen on the 1980 album Crocodiles

Television
 Monkey (TV series), a live-action TV series based on Journey to the West
 The New Legends of Monkey, a live-action TV series inspired by the Monkey TV series

Other uses in arts, entertainment, and media
 Monkey (dance), a novelty dance
 Monkey: Journey to the West, a stage adaptation of Journey to the West

Brands and enterprises
 Monkey, a model in the Honda Z series of motorcycles
 The Monkeys (company), an Australian creative agency

Computing and technology
 Monkey HTTP Server

Other uses
 Monkey (zodiac), a Chinese zodiac sign
 Monkey, a London slang term meaning £500
 HMS Monkey, the name of several Royal Navy vessels
 Monkey squat, the name sometimes given to a partial squat

See also
 Monkey Business (disambiguation)
 The Monkees, an American pop/rock band